Like many Indo-Aryan languages, Hindustani (Hindi-Urdu) has a decimal numeral system that is contracted to the extent that nearly every number 1–99 is irregular, and needs to be memorized as a separate numeral.

Numbers from 100 up are more regular. There are numerals for 100, sau; 1,000, hazār; and successive multiples by 100 of 1000: lākh (lakh) 100,000 (105), karoṛ (crore) 1,00,00,000 (107), arab 1,00,00,00,000 (109, billion), kharab 1,00,00,00,00,000 (1011), nīl 1,00,00,00,00,00,000 (1013), padma 1,00,00,00,00,00,00,000 (1015, quadrillion). (See Indian numbering system.) Lakh and crore are common enough to have entered Indian English.

In writing Hindi, numbers are usually represented using Devanagari numeral signs, while in Urdu the signs employed are those of a modified Eastern Arabic numeral system.

References

Hindustani language
Numerals